Ribes burejense, sometimes known as the Bureja gooseberry, is a species of flowering plant in the currant/gooseberry family Grossulariacea, generally regarded as closely related to Ribes aciculare.

Like other Ribes species, R. burejense is particularly susceptible to honey fungus.

References

Flora of Asia
burejense
Edible plants